Kurt Brennecke (16 December 1891 – 30 December 1982) was a General der Infanterie in the Wehrmacht during World War II who commanded the XXXXIII. Armeekorps. He was also a recipient of the Knight's Cross of the Iron Cross. Kurt Brennecke was captured by American troops in May 1945 and was released in March 1948.

Awards and decorations

 Knight's Cross of the Iron Cross on 22 February 1942 as General der Infanterie and commander of XXXXIII. Armeekorps
 Order of Merit of the Federal Republic of Germany

References

Citations

Bibliography

1891 births
1982 deaths
20th-century Freikorps personnel
Commanders Crosses of the Order of Merit of the Federal Republic of Germany
German Army generals of World War II
Generals of Infantry (Wehrmacht)
German Army personnel of World War I
German prisoners of war in World War II held by the United States
People from the Province of Hanover
People from Salzgitter
Recipients of the clasp to the Iron Cross, 1st class
Recipients of the Knight's Cross of the Iron Cross
Reichswehr personnel
Military personnel from Lower Saxony